The 2003 Florida Gators baseball team represented the University of Florida in the sport of baseball during the 2003 college baseball season. The Gators competed in Division I of the National Collegiate Athletic Association (NCAA) and the Eastern Division of the Southeastern Conference (SEC). They played their home games at Alfred A. McKethan Stadium, on the university's Gainesville, Florida campus. The team was coached by Pat McMahon, who was in his second season at Florida.

Roster

Schedule 

! style="background:#FF4A00;color:white;"| Regular season
|- valign="top" 

|- align="center" bgcolor="ddffdd"
| February 7  ||||
| McKethan Stadium ||15–5
|Falkenbach (1–0)
|Morrison (1–2)
|None
|2,420
|1–0||–
|- align="center" bgcolor="ddffdd"
| February 8  ||Mercer||
| McKethan Stadium ||22–2
|Hoyman (1–0)
|Bishop (1–1)
|None
|1,535
|2–0||–
|- align="center" bgcolor="ddffdd"
| February 12  ||||
| McKethan Stadium ||10-910
|Roberson (1–0)
|Holmen (0–1)
|None
|1,377
|3–0||–
|- align="center" bgcolor="ffdddd"
| February 14  ||No. 14 Miami (FL)Rivalry||
| McKethan Stadium ||2–9
|Touchet (1–0)
|O'Day (0–1)
|None
|2,226
|3–1||–
|- align="center" bgcolor="ddffdd"
| February 15  ||No. 14 Miami (FL)Rivalry||
| McKethan Stadium ||5–3
|Roberson (2–0)
|Bongiovanni (1–1)
|None
|3,594
|4–1
|–
|- align="center" bgcolor="ddffdd"
| February 19  ||||
| McKethan Stadium ||17–2
|Pete (1–0)
|Patrick (1–2)
|None
|1,392
|5–1
|–
|- align="center" bgcolor="ddffdd"
| February 21  ||||
| McKethan Stadium ||17–6
|Falkenbach (2–0)
|Smar (0–1)
|None
|1,327
|6–1
|–
|- align="center" bgcolor="ddffdd"
| February 23 (1) ||Hofstra||
| McKethan Stadium ||13–2
|Hoyman (2–0)
|Cosentino (0–1)
|None
|–
|7–1
|–
|- align="center" bgcolor="ddffdd"
| February 23 (2) ||Hofstra||
| McKethan Stadium ||28–6
|Boss (1–0)
|Taylor (0–1)
|None
|1,924
|8–1
|–
|- align="center" bgcolor="ddffdd"
| February 25  ||||No. 23
| McKethan Stadium ||13-1214
|Potter (1–0)
|Griffin (1–1)
|None
|1,267
|9–1
|–
|-

|- align="center" bgcolor="ddffdd"
| March 1  ||||No. 23|| McKethan Stadium ||11–1||Potter (2–0)||Bitter (0–3)||None||1,428||10–1||–
|- align="center" bgcolor="ddffdd"
| March 2  ||Siena||No. 23|| McKethan Stadium ||5–4||O'Day (1–1)||Cabot (0–3)||None||1,016||11–1||–
|- align="center" bgcolor="ddffdd"
| March 5  ||||No. 16|| McKethan Stadium ||9–5||Ball (1–0)||Martin (2–2)||None||1,029||12–1||–
|- align="center" bgcolor="ffdddd"
| March 7  ||at No. 1 Rivalry||No. 16||Dick Howser StadiumTallahassee, FL||4–5||Lynch (4–0)||Pete (1–1)||Hodges (3)||3,652||12–2||–
|- align="center" bgcolor="ffdddd"
| March 8  ||at No. 1 Florida StateRivalry||No. 16||Dick Howser Stadium||7–9||Davidson (1–0)||Ball (1–1)||Hodges (4)||4,028||12–3||–
|- align="center" bgcolor="ddffdd"
| March 9  ||No. 1 Florida StateRivalry||No. 16|| McKethan Stadium ||9–8||Hoyman (3–0)||Cannon (0–1)||Sanabria (1)||2,859||13–3||–
|- align="center" bgcolor="ddffdd"
| March 11  ||||No. 16|| McKethan Stadium ||9–2||Ball (2–1)||Van Riper  (0–1)||None||1,448||14–3||–
|- align="center" bgcolor="ddffdd"
| March 12  ||Pace||No. 16|| McKethan Stadium ||12–2||Madson (1–0)||Huff (0–1)||None||1,170||15–3||–
|- align="center" bgcolor="ffdddd"
| March 14  ||at No. 18 ||No. 16||Alex Box StadiumBaton Rouge, LA||0–9||Wilson (4–2)||Falkenbach (2–1)||None||7,835||15–4||0–1
|- align="center" bgcolor="ffdddd"
| March 15  ||at No. 18 LSU||No. 16||Alex Box Stadium||2–3||Pettit (3–0)||Hoyman (3–1)||None||7,698||15–5||0–2
|- align="center" bgcolor="F0E8E8"
| March 16  ||at No. 18 LSU||No. 16||Alex Box Stadium||8–8||None||None||None||7,375||15–5–1||0–2–1
|- align="center" bgcolor="ddffdd"
| March 18  ||||No. 22|| McKethan Stadium ||24–8||Madson (2–0)||Oleksak (0–1)||None||1,247||16–5–1||–
|- align="center" bgcolor="ddffdd"
| March 19  ||||No. 22|| McKethan Stadium ||16–0||Ball (3–1)||Copello (1–1)||None||1,601||17–5–1||–
|- align="center" bgcolor="ffdddd"
| March 21  ||No. 18 ||No. 22|| McKethan Stadium ||3–8||Tankersley (4–0)||Sanabria (0–1)||None||1,913||17–6–1||0–3–1
|- align="center" bgcolor="ddffdd"
| March 22  ||No. 18 Alabama||No. 22|| McKethan Stadium ||6–1||Hoyman (4–1)||Carter (4–2)||None||2,864||18–6–1
|1–3–1
|- align="center" bgcolor="ddffdd"
| March 23  ||No. 18 Alabama||No. 22|| McKethan Stadium ||6–5||O'Day (2–1)||Reed (1–1)||None||1,139||19–6–1
|2–3–1
|- align="center" bgcolor="F0E8E8"
| March 26  ||Spain (national team) (exh.)||No. 18||McKethan Stadium||18–17||Roberson||Ventura||None||–||–||–
|- align="center" bgcolor="ddffdd"
| March 28  ||||No. 18|| McKethan Stadium ||5–3||Falkenbach (3–1)||Hochevar (4–2)||None||2,386||20–6–1
|3–3–1
|- align="center" bgcolor="ddffdd"
| March 29  ||Tennessee||No. 18|| McKethan Stadium ||5–1||Hoyman (5–1)||Tharpe (3–2)||None||2,964||21–6–1
|4–3–1
|- align="center" bgcolor="ddffdd"
| March 30  ||Tennessee||No. 18|| McKethan Stadium ||7–5||Falkenbach (4–1)||Hochevar (4–3)||None||1,059||22–6–1
|5–3–1
|-

|- align="center" bgcolor="ddffdd"
| April 2  ||Florida A&M||No. 13|| McKethan Stadium ||14–2||Rumble (1–0)||Nunez (1–1)||None||1,023||23–6–1||–
|- align="center" bgcolor="ffdddd"
| April 4  ||at ||No. 13||Hawkins FieldNashville, TN
|1–2||Sowers (1–4)||Falkenbach (4–2)||Lewis (3)||1,011||23–7–1||5–4–1
|- align="center" bgcolor="ffdddd"
| April 5  ||at Vanderbilt||No. 13||Hawkins Field||2–4||Ransom (3–0)||Hoyman (5–2)||Buschmann (3)||768||23–8–1||5–5–1
|- align="center" bgcolor="ffdddd"
| April 6  ||at Vanderbilt||No. 13||Hawkins Field||1–4||Mullins (2–4)||Madson (2–1)||Lewis (4)||353||23–9–1||5–6–1
|- align="center" bgcolor="ddffdd"
| April 9  ||||No. 23|| McKethan Stadium ||10–4||O'Day (3–1)||Lincoln (2–7)||None||1,395||24–9–1||–
|- align="center" bgcolor="ffdddd"
| April 11  ||||No. 23|| McKethan Stadium ||4–9||Bondurant (4–2)||O'Day (3–2)||None||2,085||24–10–1||5–7–1
|- align="center" bgcolor="ffdddd"
| April 12  ||South Carolina||No. 23|| McKethan Stadium ||2–10||Marchbanks (7–2)||Hoyman (5–3)||None||2,809
|24–11–1||5–8–1
|- align="center" bgcolor="ddffdd"
| April 13  ||South Carolina||No. 23|| McKethan Stadium ||13–4||Pete (2–1)||Donald (0–1)||Boss (1)||1,952||25–11–1||6–8–1
|- align="center" bgcolor="ddffdd"
| April 15  |||||| McKethan Stadium ||9–1||Ball (4–1)||Worrall (1–1)||None||1,154||26–11–1||–
|- align="center" bgcolor="ffdddd"
| April 18  ||at ||||Foley FieldAthens, GA||4–5||Ruthven (3–4)||Boss (1–1)||Benefield (2)||1,538||26–12–1||6–9–1
|- align="center" bgcolor="ddffdd"
| April 19  ||at Georgia||||Foley Field||4–3||Hoyman (6–3)||Woods (1–4)||None||1,892||27–12–1||7–9–1
|- align="center" bgcolor="ddffdd"
| April 20  ||at Georgia||||Foley Field||8–4||Madson (3–1)||Westphal (3–2)||None||1,028||28–12–1||8–9–1
|- align="center" bgcolor="ddffdd"
| April 23  |||||| McKethan Stadium ||11–8||Pete (3–1)||Andres (1–2)||Falkenbach (1)||1,273||29–12–1||–
|- align="center" bgcolor="ddffdd"
| April 26 (1) ||No. 13 |||| McKethan Stadium ||13–5||Sanabria (1–1)||Maholm (6–2)||None||–||30–12–1||9–9–1
|- align="center" bgcolor="ffdddd"
| April 26 (2) ||No. 13 Mississippi State|||| McKethan Stadium ||5–6||Gant (2–1)||Boss (1–2)||Papelbon (6)||2,053||30–13–1||9–10–1
|- align="center" bgcolor="ddffdd"
| April 27  ||No. 13 Mississippi State|||| McKethan Stadium ||14–6||Hoyman (7–3)||Nicholas (4–2)||None||2,638||31–13–1||10–10–1
|-

|- align="center" bgcolor="ffdddd"
| May 3 (1) ||at No. 18 ||||Plainsman ParkAuburn, AL||2–7||Hughey (5–4)||Ball (4–2)||None||–||31–14–1||10–11–1
|- align="center" bgcolor="ddffdd"
| May 3 (2) ||at No. 18 Auburn||||Plainsman Park||8–6||Boss (2–2)||Dennis (2–2)||Falkenbach (2)||3,489||32–14–1||11–11–1
|- align="center" bgcolor="ffdddd"
| May 4 ||at No. 18 Auburn||||Plainsman Park||3–4||Paxton (6–1)||Hoyman (7–4)||Speigner (1)||3,048||32–15–1||11–12–1
|- align="center" bgcolor="ffdddd"
| May 9 ||at ||||Swayze FieldOxford, MS||0–2||Beam (7–1)||Boss (2–3)||Head (11)||2,422||32–16–1||11–13–1
|- align="center" bgcolor="ffdddd"
| May 10 ||at Ole Miss||||Swayze Field||3–8||Wright (4–2)||Hoyman (7–5)||Cupps (2)||2,539||32–17–1||11–14–1
|- align="center" bgcolor="ffdddd"
| May 11 ||at Ole Miss||||Swayze Field||2–4||Holliman (4–5)||Pete (3–2)||Head (12)||2,003||32–18–1||11–15–1
|- align="center" bgcolor="ddffdd"
| May 16 |||||| McKethan Stadium ||19–0||Hoyman (8–5)||Wade (3–7)||None||2,876||33–18–1||12–15–1
|- align="center" bgcolor="ddffdd"
| May 17 ||Kentucky|||| McKethan Stadium ||13–4||Pete (4–2)||Castle (6–5)||None||2,588||34–18–1||13–16–1
|- align="center" bgcolor="ffdddd"
| May 18 ||Kentucky|||| McKethan Stadium ||5–7||Gibson (3–3)||O'Day (3–3)||None||2,078||34–19–1||13–17–1
|-

|-
! style="background:#FF4A00;color:white;"| Post-season
|-

|- align="center" bgcolor="ffdddd"
| May 30  ||||||Mark Light StadiumCoral Gables, FL||3–4||Core (10–2)||Hoyman (8–6)||Pillsbury (5)||–||34–20–1||0–1
|- align="center" bgcolor="ddffdd"
| May 31 (1) ||vs. Bethune–Cookman||||Mark Light Stadium||8–6||Pete (5–2)||Rivera (6–5)||Falkenbach (3)||–||35–20–1||1–1
|- align="center" bgcolor="ddffdd"
| May 31 (2) ||||||Mark Light Stadium||22–14||Potter (3–0)||Della Rocco (2–1)||None||5,251||36–20–1||2–1
|- align="center" bgcolor="ddffdd"
|June 1 (1)||at No. 13 Miami (FL)Rivalry||||Mark Light Stadium||15–5||O'Day (4–3)||Camardese (9–1)||Pete (1)||–||37–20–1||3–1
|- align="center" bgcolor="ffdddd"
|June 1 (2)||at No. 13 Miami (FL)Rivalry||||Mark Light Stadium||10–13||Valdes-Fauli (3–0)||Boss (2–4)||None||3,494||37–21–1||3–2
|-

Rankings from Collegiate Baseball. All times Eastern. Retrieved from FloridaGators.com

See also 
 Florida Gators
 List of Florida Gators baseball players

References

External links 
 Gator Baseball official website

Florida Gators baseball seasons
Florida Gators baseball team
Florida Gators
Florida